Azita is a Persian feminine given name. Meaning of Azita: Name Azita in the Persian origin, means Noble; High-born; Humble; Free Woman; Name of an Iranian Princess.

People 

Azita Ghahreman, Iranian poet
Azita Ghanizada, Afghan American actress
Azita Hajian, Iranian actress
Azita Raji (1961–2022), Iranian-born American diplomat, banker, and philanthropist
Azita Sahebjam, ballet director in Vancouver, Canada
Azita Shariati, Iranian-born Swedish business executive
Azita Youssefi, Iranian-American experimental musician